Pioneer or The Pioneer is the name of the following newspapers:

Australia
The Federal Capital Pioneer, newspaper published in Canberra, Australia from 1924–27
The Pioneer (South Australia), newspaper published in Yorketown, South Australia 1903–60

India
The Pioneer (India), an English-language newspaper published since 1865

United Kingdom
Merthyr Pioneer, weekly socialist paper published in Wales from 1911 to 1922
North Wales Pioneer, a newspaper in Wales

United States
Animas Forks Pioneer, published from 1882 to 1886 in Animas Forks, Colorado
Black Hills Pioneer, published in Spearfish, South Dakota
The Madras Pioneer, a weekly paper published in Madras, Oregon, since 1904
Molalla Pioneer, a local weekly newspaper in Molalla, Oregon, which began publishing in 1913
Pine City Pioneer, a weekly newspaper publisher in Pine County, Minnesota
The Pioneer, a short-lived nineteenth-century journal co-founded by James Russell Lowell in Massachusetts.
The Pioneer (Bemidji), published in Bemidji, Minnesota
St. Paul Pioneer Press, published in St. Paul, Minnesota

See also
 Raivaaja, a Finnish-American newspaper published from 1905–2009 in Fitchburg, Massachusetts
Journal Pioneer, daily newspaper published in Summerside, Prince Edward Island, Canada
Craven Herald & Pioneer, weekly newspaper covering the Craven area of North Yorkshire, England
The Labour Pioneer, a monthly socialist periodical issued from Cardiff, Wales between 1900 and 1902
Den Danske Pioneer, oldest Danish language newspaper published in the United States
 Pioneer (disambiguation)